Ibn Mu‘ṭī al-ZawāwīAbū 'l-Ḥusayn Yaḥyā ibn ‘Abd al-Nur Zayn al-Dīn al-Zawāwī, or Abū Zakarīyā’ Yaḥyā ibn ‘Abd al-Mu’ṭī ibn ‘Abdannūr az-Zawāwī ( – 1231 CE (564–628 AH)); was a Ḥanafī faqīh (jurist), grammarian, poet and philologian of the Maghreb and the author of first versified grammatical work, the Alfiyya, commentaries on grammatical treatises and versified lexicographic works. He also wrote numerous works on various scholarly categories. He was one of the foremost medieval Arabic grammarians.

Life
Ibn Mu’ṭī al-Zawāwī was born in Béjaïa in 1168 into the Berber Zawāwa tribe hence his nisba “al-Zawāwī”. He grew up during the scientific and cultural efflorescence of the Islamic Maghreb. The region centred on the city of Béjaïa was at the pinnacle of its prosperity. He studied under Abu Musa al-Jazuli. He memorised Al-Ṣiḥāḥ fī al-lughah of al-Jawhari           

He received early education in Béjaïa. In 1227 (624 AH) he travelled East to Damascus with a delegation, and was welcomed by the Ayyubid ruler, Al-Mu'azzam Isa. He then spent many years teaching philology in the mosques of Damascus. In this period he simplified the teaching of language, literature and grammar.

When al-Mu'azzam Īsā al-Ayyūbī died, the sultan's son, al-Naṣr Dā’ūd, was quickly deposed by his two uncles al-Kāmil and al-Ashraf. The new sultan al-Kāmil honoured Ibn Mu’ti and persuaded him to accompany him to Cairo where he was given a salary and appointed lecturer in grammar and literature at the Mosque of Amr ibn al-As, also known as ‘al-Jamī ‘l-Atīk’.

He composed a number of works on grammar as well as a collection of orations, a diwan of poetry and a treatise on the readings of the Quran. The most important out of the works he produced is ad-Durra al-alfiyya which was a pedagogical grammar of the Arabic language composed in verse totalling one thousand lines, several commentaries were written on it. This work appears frequently in the list of works studied of memorised by the ulama of the Mamluk period. His work was also the model for a new genre of compositions as many subsequent scholars would try their hands at writing alfiyyat.

Ibn Mu’ṭī died in Sept 1231, his funeral was attended by the Ayyubid Sultan and he was buried near the mausoleum of imām al-Shāfī by the Khandak.

Teachers
Ibn Mu‘ṭī studied fiqh ḥadīth, jurisprudence and language with distinguished scholars each famous in his field:

Abū Mūsā al-Jazūlī (1146 - ca.1211)             

Al-Qāsim Ibn Asakir, d.1204/600 AH             

Taj al-Dīn al-Kindi (1126 - 1217)

Mamluk al-Kindi d.1258/656 AH

Pupils

Ibn al-Hajib d. 1247

As-Suwaydi

Ibn al-Anbārī

Works
Al-Durra al-alfiyya fi Ilm al-‘arabiyya;  produced 3. Nov. 1198 AD (595 AH) the first grammatical treatise in one thousand verses. Numerous scholars wrote commentaries of it and ed., K. V. Zetterstéen produced a critical edition (Leipzig 1900).  Muḥammad ibn Aḥmad al-Andalusī Bakri al-Sharīshī (1286/ 685) wrote a commentary titled Al-Ta'liqāt al-Wafīyāt.   The later Alfiyya of Ibn Mālik (1204-1274) eclipsed its fame.

Sharh li Alfiyya Ibn Mu‘ṭī by Jamal al-Dīn a. Muḥ. Ḥusayn b Ayāz al-Baghdādī (611/1282 Suyūṭī Bugya 232/3)
Kitāb al-Fuṣūl —‘Book of aphorisms’; grammatical prose treatise numerous commentaries.

Al-Fuṣūl al-khamsīn (Leipzig 1899). E. Sjögren chaps., 1-2.

Al-Badī' fī ṣinā'at ash-shi'r (Leipzig, 488, iii)
Al-‘uqud wa’l-qawanīn fī al-naḥw; ‘Contracts and laws of grammar’

Kitāb ḥawāšin ‘alā 'uṣul Ibn al-Sarrāj fī al-naḥw; ‘Commentary on the origins of Ibn al-Sarrāj on grammar’.

Kitāb šarḥ al-jumal fī al-naḥw; Phrasal Syntax Analysis

Kitāb šarḥ 'abyāt Sībawayh naẓm; Analysis of Sībawayh's verse systems

Kitāb dīwān khaṭib; Dīwān of Sermons

Qaṣida fī al-qara'a al-sabah ‘Poem on the Seven Readings

Naẓm Kitāb al-ṣiḥāḥ li’l-Jauharī fī al-lughah; ‘Edited Al-Jauharī’s Al-Ṣiḥāḥ, (dictionary) on the essence of language’ (incomplete).

Naẓm Kitāb al-Jamharah li Ibn Duraid fī al-lughah; Method of Jamhara fi 'l-Lughat by Ibn Duraid on the science of language (not completed)

Naẓm Kitāban fī al-‘arud; Systems of ‘arūḍ (poetic meters).

Kitāb al-muthlath; ‘Book of the Triangle’

Notes

References

Bibliography

Primary sources

Secondary sources 

1160s births
1231 deaths
12th-century Berber people
12th-century jurists
12th-century philologists
12th-century poets
12th-century writers
13th-century Berber people
13th-century jurists
13th-century philologists
13th-century poets
13th-century writers
Arabic grammar
Berber grammarians
Berber poets
People from Béjaïa